KRI Teluk Ende (517) is the sixth  of the Indonesian Navy.

Design 

She was powered by two diesel engines, with total sustained power output of  distributed in two shaft.

Teluk Banten has a capacity of 200 troops,  of cargo (which includes 17 main battle tanks), and 2 LCVPs on davits. The ship has a complement of 90 personnel, including 13 officers. Teluk Banten is a command ship variant of the class and has distinguishing features such as the LCVP davits located forward of the bridge and the exhaust vents above the waterlines instead of funnels found on the other ships.

She were armed with two single Bofors 40 mm L/70 guns, two single Rheinmettal 20 mm autocannons, and two single DShK 12.7 mm heavy machine guns.

The ship has hangar facility and helicopter deck in the aft with provisions for up to 3 Eurocopter AS332 Super Puma helicopters.

Construction and commissioning 
Teluk Ende was built by Korea Tacoma Shipyard in Masan, ordered in June 1981. She was commissioned on 1 September 1982.

She was docked at the Trisakti Harbor pier on 15 October 2019, at 15.00 WITA for 3 days until 17 October 2019. The mission of this visit was to provide education and share experiences from AAL cadets on visits to schools. With the agenda of the visit, it was hoped that it will increase the motivation of the younger generation who have graduated from school in Banau, South Kalimantan so that they want to work and devote themselves to being Navy soldiers.

She carried hundreds of Navy level II cadets leaning against the port of Tanjung Bara, Sangatta, East Kutai Regency, East Kalimantan Province on 20 October 2019. On this mission, she took the cadets to carry out socialization in schools in the East Kutai Regency area.

She brought clean water assistance to Sapudi Island, Madura and docked at the Sapudi Island pier on 4 November 2019. The long dry season caused drought and made residents on Sapudi Island experience a clean water crisis, making it difficult for them to meet their daily needs. The dry conditions moved Koarmada II in collaboration with the Regional Disaster Management Agency (BPBD) of East Java to provide clean water assistance. In this mission, she brought members of the Sumenep Drought Disaster Management Task Force consisting of personnel from the Joint Fleet Task Force, Lantamal V and Lanal Batuporon, 1 SST Yonmarhanlan, East Java BPBD, Tagana and Satpol PP, which amounted to approximately 200 people, brought 2 units of material. The Bromo and Tambora Tug Boats as well as 1 unit of fresh water barge from Lantamal V, carried 3,000 - 5,000 jerry cans of clean water, each containing 25 liters of water, carrying three East Java BPDB water tankers, each carrying 50,000 liters of clean water.

Gallery

References

Bibliography
 
 

Ships built by Hanjin Heavy Industries
Amphibious warfare vessels of the Indonesian Navy
Teluk Semangka-class tank landing ships
1982 ships